Bill Giant (March 2, 1930 – November 26, 1987) was a songwriter whose work included over 40 songs for Elvis Presley.

Biography
Giant grew up in New York City and was known as Bill "Harvey" Zimmerman.  He was part of the popular songwriting team Giant, Baum and Kaye, writing songs with Bernie Baum and Florence Kaye. The majority of their work was used in Presley movies, although their most popular recording was "(You're The) Devil in Disguise" which reached No.3 on the U.S. Billboard Hot 100 and No.1 on the U.K. singles chart in 1963. They were also credited with writing the American version of Osamu Tezuka's anime "Kimba the White Lion" (1965).  Giant became a realtor in Middlesex County, New Jersey in his later years. His other memorable name was Billy Merman.

Other works
His other works include songs in the following films:
Roustabout
 Viva Las Vegas (The title track was written by Doc Pomus and Mort Shuman.)
Fun in Acapulco
Girls! Girls! Girls!
It Happened at the World's Fair
Kissin' Cousins
Girl Happy
Harum Scarum
Frankie and Johnny
Paradise, Hawaiian Style
Spinout
Easy Come, Easy Go
Double Trouble
Live a Little, Love a Little

External links
 
 

1930 births
1987 deaths
American male songwriters
20th-century American musicians
20th-century American male musicians